The 25th Sarasaviya Awards festival (Sinhala: 25වැනි සරසවිය සම්මාන උලෙළ), presented by the Associated Newspapers of Ceylon Limited, was held to honor the best films of 1996 Sinhala cinema on April 2, 1998, at the Bandaranaike Memorial International Conference Hall, Colombo 07, Sri Lanka. Minister C. V. Gunaratne was the chief guest at the awards night.

The film Loku Duwa won the seven prestigious awards including Best Film.

Awards

References

Sarasaviya Awards
Sarasaviya